Hythe Pier, the Hythe Pier Railway and the Hythe Ferry provide a link between the English port city of Southampton and the Hampshire village of Hythe on the west side of Southampton Water. It is used both by commuters and tourists, and forms an important link in the Solent Way and E9 European coastal paths.

The pier, railway and ferry service are currently operated by Blue Funnel Ferries of Southampton. In October 2016 the previous owners (White Horse Ferries) warned their staff of potential redundancy which suggested an uncertain future from the pier and ferry service.  After months of talks Lee Rayment of Blue Funnel completed negotiations to acquire the Pier, Train and Ferry with operations starting on 21 April 2017.

The railway is the oldest continuously operating public pier train in the world.

The ferry was due to stop operating from the end of 2022 but services continued in the hope that a new owner could be found.

Hythe Pier

Hythe Pier stretches  from the centre of Hythe to the deep water channel of Southampton Water, making it the 7th longest pier in the British Isles.

A company was formed to construct a pier in 1870 and in 1871 it obtained an Act of Parliament in order to do so. This effort then stalled and a pier was not constructed.

A second company called the Hythe Pier & Hythe & Southampton Ferry company was formed in late 1874. A new act passed parliament in 1875 but legal disagreements with the Southampton Harbour and Pier Board delayed royal assent until 1878. Construction started in 1879 and the pier opened on 1 January 1881 having cost £7,000 to construct. Originally there was a toll house at the landward end of the pier, and this was replaced by the present ticket office in the first decade of the 20th century. The original toll house still exists and is occupied by a local travel operator. Large scale maintenance was carried out on the pier in 1896 at a cost of £1,500.

The pier and its associated structures were awarded Grade II listed status in August 2021.

Hythe Pier Railway

The 1878 Act of Parliament made provision for the construction of a tramway along the pier, although one was not originally laid. The trucks that carried luggage along the pier were found to be damaging the pier decking, and in 1909 a narrow gauge railway was constructed on the northern side of the pier to replace them. The vehicles were hand-propelled, and the track was laid flush with the pier decking.

In 1922, the current electrified railway was constructed on the southern side of the pier. The track is laid to  narrow gauge and is electrified at 250 V DC by a third rail on the seaward side of the track. The line consists of a single track with no passing loops, with two non-electrified sidings at the landward end. One of the sidings enters the line's covered workshop. Stations, equipped with low wooden platforms, exist at both ends of the line. The pier head station has an overall roof, whilst the landward station has a ticket office and waiting shelter.

The line is operated by two four-wheeled electric locomotives built in 1917 by Brush with works numbers 16302 & 16307 (simply renumbered as No. 2 & No. 1 - the '7' looking like a '1'.). They were originally battery powered, being used at the World War I mustard gas factory at Avonmouth. They were transferred to Hythe after the war, where they were converted to collect power from a third rail and had their batteries removed. There was initially a third locomotive, but it was used for spares and finally scrapped in 1935. All that remains of the 3rd tractor is the electric motor bearing the serial number "16304".

The line owns four bogie passenger coaches, two of which have a driving cab at their seaward ends. In normal operation the single train is made up of one of the locomotives propelling three passenger coaches, with a four-wheel flat car for baggage. The locomotive is always at the landward end, and the seaward passenger coach must have a driving cab. The line also has a four-wheel oil-tanker, used to carry fuel to the Hythe ferries.

Hythe Ferry

Every train connects at the pier head with an arrival and departure of the Hythe Ferry. The ferry carries passengers and bicycles, and takes about 10 minutes for the crossing.

The Southampton terminal is at the Town Quay, also the terminal of the Red Funnel ferries to the Isle of Wight. Town Quay is a short walk from the city centre, and is linked to both the city centre and Southampton Central railway station by bus.

A ferry has operated from Hythe to Southampton since the Middle Ages, and it is marked on a map by Christopher Saxton of 1575. Steam vessels were introduced in 1830. From 1889, the Percy family were involved in the running of the ferry, and from 1900 to 1980 the service was run by the General Estates Company, owned by the Percy family. As a consequence of this, many of the ferries used carried the name Hotspur, named after Henry Percy or Hotspur, who was immortalised by William Shakespeare.

The current owners, Blue Funnel, have two regular vessels providing the ferry service with a 3rd, Ocean Scene,  as cover when necessary.
 Hythe Scene  (formerly known as ) is a catamaran ferry originally used on the White Horse Ferries service across the River Thames from Tilbury to Gravesend.
Jenny Ann (formerly known as Faldore II and Puffin Belle)

Previous ferries to have operated on the service include:
 ex Gosport Ferry, Southsea Queen bought in 1978 to operate cruises and act as standby vessel for the ferry.
 introduced in 1982.  She utilised the engines removed from Hotspur III.
 was borrowed from the Hurst Castle ferry service in 2013.
 removed from service following a collision with the pier on 13 May 2016. As a result of the collision the Maritime and Coastguard Agency withdrew the vessel's passenger safety certificate and vessel was later sold.
 was built in 1946 and served on the service until 2014.

Hotspur IV was the last in a line of similar ferries. One of her earlier half-sisters, Hotspur II of 1936, saw further service as a ferry on the Firth of Clyde under the name Kenilworth.

Change of pier ownership
A local community group held a public meeting on 24 November 2016 and announced its intentions to "Save Hythe Pier and ferry" by setting up a Charitable Community Benefit Society under the name of "Hythe Pier Heritage Association. In February 2017 Hampshire County Council made an emergency payment to White Horse Ferries to allow them to charter a replacement ferry while MV Great Expectations underwent maintenance. 

On 6 February 2019, 140 years after the original pier construction, Blue Funnel announced they intended to hand over the pier to the Hythe Pier Heritage Association.

Collisions
On 30 July 1885, the pier was hit by the schooner Annie, damaging five of the pier's piles. On 26 August 1915 the pier was hit by the sailing barge Itchen although on this occasion there was no damage to the pier. The pier's piles were again damaged in 1945 when an infantry landing craft collided with it.

In the evening of 1 November 2003 at 18:08, the dredger  collided with the pier, tearing a  hole through the midsection and isolating the pier head from the land. The dredger did not collide with the pier train, and there were no casualties. The incident occurred a few minutes after a crowd of people were heading home after a football match. Repairs to the pier were carried out by Dudley Barnes Marine with Beckett Rankine as the designer; the cost was £308,000 and the pier reopened on 7 January 2004. The master of the dredger was sentenced to eight months in prison after pleading guilty to an act likely to cause the death of or serious injury to any person while under the influence of drink and causing damage to a structure while under the influence of drinking.

On 13 May 2016, the ferry Uriah Heep collided with the pier damaging the ferry's wheelhouse and requiring it to be withdrawn from service.  The Marine Accident Investigation Branch report concluded the loss of control leading to the collision was almost certainly from a mechanical failure within the hydraulic circuit that powered the thrust deflector.  The report also noted the ferry berth at Hythe afforded little space to abort an approach in the event of a malfunction.

References

External links

Hythe Ferry website
MAIB report on the 2003 collision
MAIB report on the 2016 collision
 Blue Funnel Cruises
Map sources for:

Heritage railways in Hampshire
Ferry companies of England
Ferry transport in England
Piers in Hampshire
Pier railways
2 ft gauge railways in England
Transport in Southampton
Buildings and structures in Hampshire
Hythe, Hampshire
Grade II listed buildings in Hampshire